Syngryanovo (Heñrän) is a rural locality (a village) in Kadyrovsky Selsoviet, Ilishevsky District, Bashkortostan, Russia. The population was 388 as of 2010. There are 7 streets.

Geography 
Syngryanovo is located 31 km southwest of Verkhneyarkeyevo (the district's administrative centre) by road. Novoilikovo is the nearest rural locality.

References 

Rural localities in Ilishevsky District